William Mbongo Desire Hondermarck (born 21 November 2000) is a professional footballer who plays as a midfielder for Northampton Town. Born in France, he represents the Republic of Ireland U21s.

Early life
Hondermarck was born in Orléans, France in 2000, but his family moved to Dublin in 2005 due to work commitments. He attended St. Fintan's High School in Dublin. His father is a German-born Frenchman, and his mother is French of Congolese descent. Due to his upbringing in Ireland, he holds an Irish passport since 2019, making him eligible to play for the Republic of Ireland which he stated in 2021 he was keen to do.

Career

Early career
Having made 14 appearances for Drogheda United during the 2018 season, he joined Norwich City in January 2019. He joined League Two club Harrogate Town on loan until the end of the season in January 2021. He made his debut for the club on 9 January 2021 as a substitute in a 2–1 defeat to Cambridge United. He made his first start for the club on 30 April 2021 in a 5–4 win over Cambridge United. He made 3 appearances in total during his loan spell at Harrogate Town, and was released by Norwich at the end of the season.

Barnsley
After a trial spell with Notts County in summer 2021, he signed for EFL Championship club Barnsley in September 2021.

In summer 2022, Hondermarck signed a new two-year contract with Barnsley.

Northampton Town
In January 2023, Hondermarck signed for League Two club Northampton Town on a two-and-a-half year contract.

International career
On 8 November 2021, Hondermarck was called up to the Republic of Ireland U21 squad for the first time for their 2023 UEFA European Under-21 Championship qualifiers against Italy and Sweden as a replacement for the injured Ryan Johansson.

Career statistics

References

2000 births
Living people
Footballers from Orléans
Republic of Ireland association footballers
Republic of Ireland under-21 international footballers
French footballers
Irish people of French descent
Irish people of Democratic Republic of the Congo descent
Irish sportspeople of African descent
French sportspeople of Democratic Republic of the Congo descent
French emigrants to Ireland
Association football midfielders
Drogheda United F.C. players
Norwich City F.C. players
Harrogate Town A.F.C. players
Barnsley F.C. players
Northampton Town F.C. players
League of Ireland players
English Football League players
Association footballers from Dublin (city)
Black French sportspeople